Veronicelloidea is a superfamily of air-breathing land slugs. They are terrestrial pulmonate gastropod molluscs in the clade Systellommatophora.

Taxonomy 
The following two families were recognized in the taxonomy of Bouchet & Rocroi (2005):
 family Veronicellidae Gray, 1840
 family Rathouisiidae Heude, 1885

References 

Panpulmonata
Gastropod superfamilies
Taxa named by John Edward Gray